Illinois Mountain is a  mountain located south of the Catskill Mountains of New York west of Poughkeepsie. Illinois Mountain is north of Marlboro Mountain.

References

Mountains of Ulster County, New York
Mountains of New York (state)